Champdepraz;  is a town and comune in the Aosta Valley region of northwestern Italy.

Geography 
The town is situated in the Champdepraz valley, a lateral valley of the Aosta Valley.

The hydroelectric power station of Champdepraz is using the power of the water from Chalamy stream to generate electricity. The headquarter of the Mont Avic Natural Park, founded in 1989, is also located in this municipality.

See also
Mont Avic
Mont Glacier
Grand lac

References

External links
 Champdepraz, lovevda.it

Cities and towns in Aosta Valley